The Military Historical Museum of Artillery, Engineers and Signal Corps, also known simply as the Artillery Museum, is a state-owned military museum in Saint Petersburg, Russia. Its collections – consisting of Russian military equipment, uniforms and decorations – are hosted in the Kronverk (a crownwork of the Peter and Paul Fortress) situated on the right bank of the Neva near Alexander Park. The museum is managed by the Russian Ministry of Defence.

Location 
The museum is located on the southern shore of Petrogradsky Island, directly across the Kronverkskiy Strait from the Peter and Paul Fortress.

Exhibits 
Among the exhibits are:

 Cannons made by Andrei Chokhov – the maker of the famous Czar Cannon
 An official chariot used for transportation of the artillery banner in the middle of the 18th century
 The cannons from "the entertainment regiments" of Peter the Great
 Personal arms, medals, and gifts received by Russian emperors and military commanders
 Trophy arms (for example, Swedish and Turkish arm, and Napoleon's personal arms from his invasion of Russia)
 The famous Katyusha rocket launcher of World War II
 A room dedicated to the Kalashnikov AK-47 and its designer, Mikhail Kalashnikov.
 A wide array of Cold War era artillery pieces, anti-aircraft systems, armored vehicles, and missiles

References

External links

Official website (in English)
Unofficial website (in Russian)

Military Historical Museum of Artillery, Engineer and Signal Corps (Saint Petersburg)

Military and war museums in Saint Petersburg
Artillery museums
Peter and Paul Fortress